The Guelph Collegiate Vocational Institute (GCVI, Guelph C.V.I., GC) is a public high school in Guelph, Ontario, Canada. The school is the oldest continuously operating public high school in Guelph, and the third oldest in the province of Ontario, Canada.

Layout
The Guelph Collegiate Vocational Institute consists of four main buildings. The Old Building (building A) consists of three levels. The bottom level holds the visual arts department, chemistry department and a general sciences department. The floor above holds the guidance department, main office, geography department, math department and an auditorium that extends up into the top floor. The top floor holds the English department, family studies department and the biology department.

Building B (the New Building) has three levels as well. The business and economics departments, as well as the physics department and the nurse's office, are located on the lowest floor. A computer education department is located on the second level. The history and current languages departments are on the upper floor.
Building C is divided into two floors. Three distinct gymnasiums are located on the first floor. The cafeteria of the school is shown above.
The school's technology and music departments are housed in Building D. There are nine separate shops in the technological sector. They include: integrated technology, transportation technology, manufacturing technology, construction technology, communication technology, technological design, computer engineering technology and computer information science.

Architecture
The Old Building of the Guelph Collegiate Vocational Institute consists of building styles that are unique only to that school in the City of Guelph. The original oak doors are still present from the building's original construction in 1923. Marble and granite encase all of the hallway floors throughout The Old Building. The hallways on the main floor of The Old Building measure an outstanding 18 ft. in height. The main entrance way into the school is surrounded by a large archway. It is easy to see the vast number of students who have walked the halls of G.C.V.I. as there are large indents that have been left in the granite stairways of the school from many thousands of feet walking up and down them each day.

Notable alumni 

Mike DeAngelis, guitarist, the Arkells
Arthur William Cutten
George Alexander Drew
Charley Fox
Beth Goobie
Hugh Guthrie, K.C.,M.P.
Alfred Dryden Hales
William Ernest Hamilton
James Jerome Hill
Harry Howell, played for the Guelph Biltmore Mad Hatters
Edward Johnson
Ted Jolliffe, Ontario CCF Leader
Luke Kirby
Jean Little
John Kenneth Macalister
Andrew P. MacDonald
John McCrae
Kelly Richardson
Joey Slinger
Virginia to Vegas, stage name of Derik Baker
Liz Sandals
Donna Strickland, recipient of the Nobel Prize in Physics in 2018 and professor at the University of Waterloo

Influence on Canadian history
Former Prime Minister John Diefenbaker married a GCVI teacher, and made two prominent visits to the school including a stop as opposition leader in 1957, just weeks before being sworn in as Prime Minister, and one as Prime Minister in 1963 just before losing the next election to Liberal Leader Lester B. Pearson
John Diefenbaker’s first visit launched the 17-year political career of Alfred Dryden Hales, alumnus of G.C.V.I. Hales chaired the Public Accounts Committee for 6 years, and was beloved by his constituents.
Less than 24 hours before Diefenbaker’s first visit Prime Minister Louis St. Laurent stopped at the school. Diefenbaker drew a much larger and much more enthusiastic crowd (a sure sign of what was to come in the election).
John Diefenbaker had replaced George Alexander Drew (a former GCVI Student) as leader of the Conservative Party less than a year before becoming Prime Minister in 1957.
During the Ontario provincial elections of 1943, 1945 and 1948, both the Premier George Alexander Drew and Opposition Leader Edward Bigelow (Ted) Jolliffe were former GCVI Students, so regardless of who won the election the Premier of Ontario would have been a GCVI alumnus.
George Alexander Drew was the second GCVI student to hold the position of Federal Leader of the Opposition, following Hugh Guthrie, who held the post for little under a year in the early half of the 20th century.

See also
List of high schools in Ontario

References
 Philip Clendenning. Soviet Observer. A Memoir of my very small Part in the Collapse of the Soviet Union (Newtonville, MA 2012). Long chapter on student life at GCVI, 1955-1960.

External links
http://www.ugdsb.ca/gcvi/ - Main Page
http://www.gcviactanostra.com - GCVI Yearbook

High schools in Guelph
1854 establishments in Canada
Educational institutions established in 1854